The next election to the Landtag of Brandenburg is scheduled for autumn 2024.

Background 
The 2019 Brandenburg state election resulted in the formation of the Third Woidke cabinet; a Kenya coalition of the SPD, CDU, and Greens. The SPD became the strongest party with small losses, just ahead of the AfD, which gained many votes. The CDU lost significantly and was fell from second to third place. Die Linke also lost significantly and ended up behind the Greens. Brandenburg United Civic Movements/Free Voters re-entered the state parliament with 5.0 percent. The FDP missed out with just 4.1 percent.

In the 2021 German federal election, the Social Democratic Party won all 10 constituencies across the state.

Opinion polls

References

See also 

 Politics of Brandenburg

Elections in Brandenburg
2024 elections in Germany
Future elections in Germany